Richard Otto Maack (also Richard Karlovic Maak, Russian: Ричард Карлович Маак; 4 September 1825 – 25 November 1886) was a 19th-century Russian naturalist, geographer, and anthropologist. He is most known for his exploration of the Russian Far East and Siberia, particularly the Ussuri and Amur River valleys.  He wrote some of the first scientific descriptions of the natural history of remote Siberia and collected many biological specimens, many of which were original type specimens of previously unknown species.

Ethnically Maack was a Baltic German from Estonia; however, the Russian Empire controlled this country during his lifetime. He was a member of the Siberian branch of the Russian Geographical Society.

Biography

Maack was born in Kuressaare, Estonia and studied natural sciences at the University of St. Petersburg. In 1852 he became a professor of natural sciences at the Gymnasium in Irkutsk and later director of the school. From 1868 to 1879, he was the superintendent of all schools of northern Siberia.

During the 1850s he undertook a number of expeditions in Siberia including those to the Amur River valley (1855–1856) and the Ussuri River (1859). He also participated in the Russian Geographical Society's first expedition (1853–55) to describe the orography, geology and population of the Vilyuy and Chona River basins.

He is credited with discovering Syringa reticulata var. amurensis simultaneously and independently of Carl Maximowicz.

Plants named after him
Maack is most famous for collecting previously unknown species and sending specimens back for scientific descriptions and naming. A number of those he found on his Amur River expedition bear his name.

Maackia amurensis — Amur maackia
Lonicera maackii — Amur Honeysuckle
Prunus maackii — Amur choke cherry
Iris maackii — water tolerant Iris
Aster maackii

Animals named after him
Pelodiscus maackii (Brandt, 1857) — Amur softshell turtle

Plants named by him

Nymphaea tetragona var. wenzelii (Maack) F.Henkel et al.
Pleopeltis ussuriensis Regel & Maack
Rubia chinensis Regel & Maack

Selected publications
Puteshestvie na Amur/Путешествие на Амур (Travels on the Amur). 1859. St. Petersburg.
Puteshestvie v dolinu reki Ussuri/Путешествие в долину реки Уссури (Journey through the Ussuri river valley). 1861. St. Petersburg.
Вилюйский округ Якутской области (Vilyuysky District of Yakut oblast) (1877–86)
Очерк флоры Уссурийской страны (Essay about flora of Ussuri land). 1862.
Енисейская губерния (Yenisei province) in the "List of settlements Russian Empire".

References

1825 births
1861 deaths
People from Kuressaare
People from Kreis Ösel
Baltic-German people
19th-century Estonian botanists
Estonian explorers
Russian naturalists
19th-century botanists from the Russian Empire
Explorers from the Russian Empire